The Bay Area Conference is a school athletic conference located in the San Francisco Bay Area. The league is a member of the North Coast Section, one of ten sections that comprise the California Interscholastic Federation.

Leagues 
The athletic conference is composed of four leagues:

Bay Counties League 
The Bay Counties League comprises nine member schools in the Bay Area with enrollments over 400:

 California Crosspoint Academy
 California School for the Deaf, Fremont
 Contra Costa Christian High School
 Fremont Christian School
 Holy Names High School
 Livermore Valley Charter Preparatory
 Making Waves Academy
 Oakland Military Institute

Bay Counties League East 
The Bay Counties League East comprises six member schools in the East Bay with enrollments under 400:

 The Athenian School
 The College Preparatory School
 Head-Royce School
 Redwood Christian School
 Valley Christian School
 Saint Joseph Notre Dame High School

Bay Counties League Central 
The Bay Counties League Central comprises six member schools in the Central Bay Area with enrollments under 400:

 Drew School
 Gateway High School
 Pescadero High School
 Jewish Community High School
 San Francisco Waldorf School
 The Bay School of San Francisco

Bay Counties League West 
The Bay Counties League West comprises seven member schools in the Western Bay Area with enrollments under 400:

 The San Domenico School
 Convent of the Sacred Heart High School
 International High School of San Francisco
 Lick-Wilmerding High School
 Marin Academy
 Stuart Hall High School
 San Francisco University High School
 The Urban School of San Francisco

References

External links
 

 
CIF North Coast Section